Adnan Örnek (born 17 October 1965) is a Turkish professional football manager and former player.

Playing career
Born in Bursa, Turkey, Örnek spent his whole career at hometown club Bursaspor. He debuted for the club in the summer of 1986 and retired after the end of the 1997–98 Turkish Süper Lig season in May 1998. For Bursaspor, he appeared in 265 league games and scored 9 goals. Örnek was also the club captain for 6 years.

Managerial career

Bursaspor
Örnek started off his managerial career in May 2017 when he was named caretaker manager of Bursaspor. He stayed at that position until the end of May, that is until the end of the 2016–17 Süper Lig season.

Čelik Zenica
On 14 June 2018, Örnek became the new manager of Bosnian Premier League club Čelik Zenica. His first win as Čelik's manager came on 29 July 2018, in a 1–0 home league win against Željezničar.

On 23 February 2019, after Čelik beat Sloboda Tuzla 2–1 in a league match, Örnek unexpectedly left the club after numerous problems and disagreements with the club's board of directors.

Managerial statistics

References

External links
Adnan Örnek at Soccerway

1965 births
Living people
Sportspeople from Bursa
Turkish footballers
Süper Lig players
Bursaspor footballers
Association football defenders
Turkish football managers
Süper Lig managers
Premier League of Bosnia and Herzegovina managers
Bursaspor managers
NK Čelik Zenica managers